The Wight Converted Seaplane was a British twin-float patrol seaplane produced by John Samuel White & Company Limited (Wight Aircraft).

Design and development
Developed from the unsuccessful Wight Bomber for use as an anti-submarine patrol aircraft, the "Converted" Seaplane was a straightforward adaptation of the landplane bomber to a seaplane.  The aircraft was a three-bay biplane with unswept, unequal span, unstaggered wings.  It had twin floats under the fuselage and additional floats at tail and wings tips. Initial production aircraft were powered by a 322 hp Rolls-Royce Eagle IV engine mounted in the nose driving a four-bladed propeller, with later production batches being powered by a 265 hp (198 kW) Sunbeam Maori engine owing to shortages of Eagles.  Fifty were ordered for the RNAS, of which only 37 were completed.

Operational history
The Converted Seaplane entered service with the RNAS in 1917, operating from bases at Calshot, Dover, Portland and Cherbourg.  On 18 August 1917, a Wight Converted Seaplane flying from Cherbourg sank the German U-boat  with a single 100 lb bomb, the first submarine to be sunk in the English Channel by direct air action.  Seven remained in service with the RAF at the end of the First World War.

Operators

Royal Naval Air Service
Royal Air Force

Specifications (Seaplane – Eagle engine)

See also

References

External links
 Wight Converted Seaplane – British Aircraft Directory

1910s British military reconnaissance aircraft
Floatplanes
Wight aircraft
Biplanes
Single-engined tractor aircraft
Aircraft first flown in 1916